Moontrap (stylized as moontrap) is an outdoor sculpture by Lee Kelly, installed at the base of Oregon City, Oregon's Singer Creek Falls, along the McLoughlin Promenade, in the United States. The abstract stainless steel sculpture was unveiled in November 2011.

See also
 2011 in art
 List of works by Lee Kelly

References

2011 establishments in Oregon
2011 sculptures
Abstract sculptures in Oregon
Buildings and structures in Oregon City, Oregon
Outdoor sculptures in Oregon
Sculptures by Lee Kelly
Stainless steel sculptures in Oregon